Zhao Yihuan (born 29 October 1987), also known as Chloe Zhao, is a Chinese actress and model.

Early life and education

Zhao graduated from Shanghai Normal University in 2011. She currently lives in Shanghai with her family.

Filmography

Film

Television

Others
Dirty King
Yi Dong Ji Huan
Xu Dong Cartoon

References

External links

1987 births
Living people
Actresses from Jilin
Manchu actresses
Chinese film actresses
Chinese television actresses